The French National Track Championships are held annually and are composed of competitions of various track cycling disciplines across various age and gender categories.

Men

Senior

Team sprint

Team pursuit

Madison

Junior

Team Pursuit

Madison

Women

Senior

Junior

References
Senior Sprint Results
2000 Results
2004 Results
2007 Results
2008 Results

Cycle racing in France
National track cycling championships